Rhodobates canariensis is a species of moth of the family Tineidae. It was described by Petersen and Gaedike in 1979. It is found on the Canary Islands.

The wingspan is about 20 mm.

References

Moths described in 1979
Myrmecozelinae
Insects of the Canary Islands